Flå is a former municipality in the old Sør-Trøndelag county, Norway. The approximately  municipality existed from 1880 until its dissolution in 1964. Flå was located in the eastern part of what is now the municipality of Melhus in Trøndelag county. The administrative centre was the village of Ler. The main church for the area is Flå Church.

History

The municipality of Flaa was established in 1880 when the municipality of Melhus was divided into two. The new municipality of Flaa had an initial population of 614. The spelling was later changed to Flå. During the 1960s, there were many municipal mergers across Norway due to the work of the Schei Committee. On 1 January 1964, the neighboring municipalities of Hølonda (population: 1,428), Horg (population: 2,560), Flå (population: 843), Melhus (population: 3,978), and the Langørgen farm (population: 11) in Buvik were all merged to form a new, larger municipality of Melhus.

Name
The municipality (originally the parish) is named after the old Flå farm since the first Flå Church was built there. Prior to the 1917 Norwegian language reform law, the name was spelled with the digraph "aa", and after this reform, the letter å was used instead.

Government
During its existence, this municipality was governed by a municipal council of elected representatives, which in turn elected a mayor.

Mayors
The mayors of Flå:

 1880–1894: Erik Andersen Kirkflaa (MV)
 1895–1898: Ole J. Bolland (MV)
 1899–1901: Lars Busklein (H)
 1902–1910: Nils Johnsen Borten (H)
 1911–1913: Henrik Larsen Reitan (H)
 1914–1916: O.K. Solstad (V)
 1917–1919: Ole A. Flaarønning (H)
 1920–1922: O.K. Solstad (V)
 1923–1925: Henrik Larsen Reitan (Bp)
 1926–1941: Eyvind Borten (Bp)
 1941–1945: Erik Engan (NS)
 1945-1945: Anders Krigsvoll (V)
 1946–1955: Per Borten (Bp)
 1956–1959: Håkon Dahl(Bp)
 1960–1963: Ingebrigt Bjørseth (Sp)

Municipal council
The municipal council  of Flå was made up of representatives that were elected to four year terms. The party breakdown of the final municipal council was as follows:

Notable people
Per Borten, who later became a Prime Minister of Norway, was the mayor of this municipality from 1945 until 1955.

See also
List of former municipalities of Norway

References

Melhus
Former municipalities of Norway
1880 establishments in Norway
1964 disestablishments in Norway